Bruce E. Tarr (born January 2, 1964) is an American politician who serves as a Republican member and Minority Leader of the Massachusetts Senate Since 1995 he has represented the 1st Essex and Middlesex District. He is a member of the United States Republican Party and a former member of the Massachusetts House of Representatives.

The 1st Essex and Middlesex district includes Gloucester, Boxford, Essex, Georgetown, Groveland, Hamilton, Ipswich, Manchester, Middleton, Newbury, North Andover, North Reading, Rockport, Rowley, Wenham, West Newbury, and Wilmington.

Early life 
Tarr was born in Gloucester, Massachusetts. He is a graduate of Suffolk University, for his undergraduate and J.D. studies.

Massachusetts House of Representatives 
Tarr served as a member of the Massachusetts House of Representatives from 1991–1995.

Massachusetts Senate 
Tarr was elected to the Massachusetts Senate in 1994, and assumed office on January 3, 1995. He has served as the Minority Leader since 2011.

Electoral history

Tarr was reelected without opposition in 1998, 2000, 2006, 2008, 2010, 2012, 2014, 2016, 2018, and 2020.

See also
 2019–2020 Massachusetts legislature
 2021–2022 Massachusetts legislature

References

External links
 General Court profile (source for the above information)
 Personal web site

|-

|-

1964 births
21st-century American politicians
American people of Greek descent
Living people
Republican Party Massachusetts state senators
Republican Party members of the Massachusetts House of Representatives
People from Gloucester, Massachusetts
Suffolk University alumni